The Chatham Anglers, more commonly referred to as the Chatham A's and formerly the Chatham Athletics, are a collegiate summer baseball team based in Chatham, Massachusetts. The team is a member of the Cape Cod Baseball League (CCBL) and plays in the league's East Division. Chatham plays its home games at historic Veteran's Field, the team's home since 1923, in the town of Chatham on the Lower Cape. The A's have been operated by the non-profit Chatham Athletic Association since 1963.

Chatham has won five CCBL championships, most recently in 1998, when they defeated the Wareham Gatemen in the championship series. The team has been led since 2017 by former Oklahoma State University field manager Tom Holliday.

History

Pre-modern era

The early Cape League era (1923–1939)
In 1923 the Cape Cod Baseball League was formed and included four teams: Chatham, Falmouth, Osterville, and Hyannis. This early Cape League operated through the 1939 season and disbanded in 1940, due in large part to the difficulty of securing ongoing funding during the Great Depression. Chatham competed in the Cape League from the league's inaugural 1923 season through the 1926 season, then from 1927 to 1929 competed as a combined Chatham-Harwich team with home games split between Veterans Field and Harwich's Brooks Park.

Chatham's 1923 team included CCBL Hall of Famer Merrill Doane. Doane, a 1924 graduate of Chatham High School, remained involved in the Cape League and Chatham baseball for over 60 years. One of the longest-tenured general managers in Cape League history, Doane was instrumental in the league's transition to an NCAA-sanctioned collegiate league in the early 1960s, and helped build the powerful Chatham teams of the 1960s. In 1925, Brockton High School star Pat Creeden played third base for Chatham, and went on to play briefly for the Boston Red Sox in 1931.

In the 1927 season, the combined Chatham-Harwich team finished fourth in the five-team league, but nevertheless was described as "the hardest hitting team in the league." 1927 Chatham-Harwich first baseman Jack Burns went on to play in seven major league seasons for the St. Louis Browns and Detroit Tigers. In all three seasons of the joint Chatham-Harwich team, the club featured Boston College batterymates pitcher Pete Herman and catcher George Colbert, as well as flashy infielder Artie Gore. The trio of Herman, Colbert and Gore later teamed up again with Barnstable to bring that club multiple Cape League championships in the 1930s. Gore went on to a major league umpiring career, working ten years in the National League, including two World Series assignments.

In 1930, Chatham again fielded its own team, as Harwich split off and became a separate club. Pete Herman remained with the Chatham team as its player-manager in 1930 and 1931, leading the team on an exciting stretch run and second-place finish just two games behind pennant-winning Wareham in 1930.

Chatham withdrew from the league prior to the 1932 season as a result of the town's decision not to appropriate funds for the team. Throughout the rest of the 1930s, Chatham's town team competed in the Cape Cod Twilight League, winning that league's title seven consecutive seasons from 1933 to 1939.

The Upper and Lower Cape League era (1946–1962)
After a hiatus during the years of World War II, the Cape League was reconstituted in 1946, with Chatham joining the Lower Cape Division. Chatham has been a member of the Cape League ever since. 

CCBL Hall of Fame skipper John Carroll took the helm at Chatham in 1961. The following season, Carroll's club finished the regular season in first place atop the Lower Cape Division, but failed to reach the Cape League title series, losing to Harwich in the Lower Cape championship series.

Modern era (1963–present)

The 1960s: A new league and a first championship
In 1963, the CCBL was reorganized and became officially sanctioned by the NCAA. The league would no longer be characterized by "town teams" who fielded mainly Cape Cod residents, but would now be a formal collegiate league. Teams began to recruit college players and coaches from an increasingly wide geographic radius. 

The league was originally composed of ten teams, which were divided into Upper Cape and Lower Cape divisions. Chatham's team, known as the Chatham Red Sox, joined Orleans, Harwich, Yarmouth and a team from Otis Air Force Base in the Lower Cape Division. 

Chatham continued to be managed by John Carroll, whose 1963 club featured CCBL Hall of Famer Ken Voges of Texas Lutheran University, who led the league with an astronomical .505 batting average. The Red Sox finished the regular season with a 28–6 record, good enough for first place in the Lower Cape Division, but fell to Orleans in the playoffs.

Chatham continued its regular season dominance in 1964, 1965 and 1966, finishing atop the Lower Cape Division each year, but falling in each season's CCBL title series. The 1964 team was piloted by Bill "Lefty" Lefebvre, who had played in the Cape League for Falmouth in the 1930s, and had later played in the major leagues with Boston and Washington. Lefebvre's team featured CCBL Hall of Fame second baseman Steve Saradnik of Providence College, who batted .314, and pitcher Charlie Hough, who went on to a 25-year major league knuckleballing career. 

In 1965, Lefebvre was succeeded by CCBL Hall of Fame manager Joe "Skip" Lewis, who led the team through 1969. Lewis' 1965 squad returned Saradnik, and added another two CCBL Hall of Famers in University of Connecticut righty Ed Baird, who posted a 3–0 record with a 0.45 ERA, and George Greer, who batted .349 and led the league in doubles and triples. 

The star-studded 1966 Chatham team returned Saradnik, Baird and Greer, and added another three CCBL Hall of Famers: catcher Tom Weir, who led the league with a .420 batting average, all-star hurler Joe Jabar, who went 7–0 with a 1.53 ERA and took home the league's Outstanding Pitcher Award, and Pittsfield, Massachusetts native Tom Grieve. Drafted out of high school in the first round, sixth overall, of the 1966 Major League Baseball draft by the Washington Senators, Grieve played in 25 games for Chatham and batted .416 prior to signing with Washington and moving on to a lengthy major league career.

In 1967, it finally came together for Lewis' boys. Saradnik, Greer, Baird and Jabar all returned and were hungry for a title. Added to the mix was Kent State University catcher Thurman Munson, who hit .420 on the season and was named league MVP. During the regular season, Chatham pitcher Don Gabriel tossed a no-hitter against Harwich at Veterans Field. Chatham again finished in first place in the Lower Cape Division, and met Upper Cape powerhouse Falmouth for the second consecutive season in the title series. In Game 1 of the championship, Chatham pitcher John Frobose twirled 13 innings in a game that was called due to darkness and ended in a 1–1 tie. Chatham took Game 2, 7–1, behind the stellar pitching of Baird. Jabar, the league's Outstanding Pitcher, was the star of Game 3, tossing a complete game five-hitter, and knocking in the game-winning RBI in Chatham's 3–2 victory, clinching the series and giving Chatham its first Cape League championship.

Munson went on to be selected by the New York Yankees in the first round, fourth overall, of the 1968 Major League Baseball draft. A perennial all-star for the Bronx Bombers, Munson won two World Series and was named the Yanks' first captain since Lou Gehrig. His tragic 1979 death brought fond reminiscences from those who knew him at Chatham. Munson was inducted into the CCBL Hall of Fame as part of its inaugural class of 2000, and his name graces the league's annual award for batting champion.

The 1970s

In the late 1960s, Chatham had dropped the nickname "Red Sox", and reverted to the colloquial Chatham Townies moniker of earlier years. In 1972, the Chatham Athletic Association settled on Chatham Athletics as the team's new moniker, and the Chatham A's were born. The A's finished the 1973 regular season in first place atop the Cape League under skipper Ben Hays. The team featured future major leaguer Dave Bergman, the CCBL batting champ who hit at a .341 clip, and CCBL Hall of Fame hurler John Caneira, the league's Outstanding Pitcher, who posted a 9–1 record and led the league with a 1.37 ERA while striking out 118 and walking only 23 in 92 innings.

CCBL Hall of Fame manager Ed Lyons took the reins in 1976, and led the A's to another first-place finish. Chatham was led by the league's Outstanding Pro Prospect Steve Taylor, and CCBL Hall of Famer Mickey O'Connor, a 6-foot-6 southpaw who went 9–0 with a 1.07 ERA and eight complete games, and was the league's Outstanding Pitcher. The team ousted Hyannis in the playoffs, but was shut down by Wareham in the title series. Lyons skippered the Athletics for seven seasons, with the team qualifying for postseason play in six of the seven years. 

The A's of the late 1970s featured Jim Lauer, who set a CCBL record with three home runs in a single game against Hyannis, Harvard University slugger and CCBL Hall of Famer Mike Stenhouse, who starred for Chatham from 1977 through 1979, and longtime major league hurler and CCBL Hall of Famer Walt Terrell, who went 9–4 with a 2.20 ERA in 1979 while working a league record 122.2 innings on the season.

The 1980s and a second championship
Lyons again skippered Chatham to a first-place finish in 1980 before succumbing to Falmouth in the championship series. The 1980 A's starred CCBL Hall of Fame outfielder Jim Sherman, a league all-star who batted .339 on the season and returned to Chatham in 1981 and enjoy another all-star season, batting .335.

In 1982, skipper Ed Lyons announced mid-season that he would be retiring after the summer. Lyons had managed six seasons at Wareham in the early 1970s, and was now in his seventh season with Chatham, but had yet to win a league title. Lyons' 1982 A's finished the regular season in fourth place with a pedestrian 20–21–1 record, having slipped into the playoffs on the final day of the season with a victory over Orleans. The team starred future major league all-star Kevin Seitzer, who hit .291 on the season and .677 in the playoffs, slugger Billy Merrifield, who clouted eight homers on the season, team MVP Brett Elbin, all-star centerfielder Greg Schuler, and the league's Outstanding Pro Prospect, pitcher Gary Kanwisher, who led the league with a 1.57 ERA. Lyons' staff included young third base coach John Schiffner. The A's matched up against first place Wareham in the playoff semi-finals, and promptly disposed of the Gatemen in two games.

In the championship series, Chatham met up with Hyannis in a best three-out-of-five title tilt. The A's went on the road for Game 1, and came away with a tight 5–4 win in 11 innings. Game 2 at Veterans Field also went to extra frames, with the Mets taking a 4–3 lead in the 11th, but the home club tied it in the bottom half, and then took the lead in the 12th to win by another 5–4 tally. Reliever Kurt Lundgren got the win in both games, coming on in the eighth inning of Game 1, then in the 12th inning of Game 2 to nail it down after starter Kanwisher held the mound through eleven. After two nail-biters, Game 3 at McKeon Park was a runaway. The A's led off the game with a dinger by Elbin and another by Merrifield, scoring four runs in the first for starter Jeff Brewer, and never looked back. Brewer tossed a complete game four-hitter, and the A's pummeled the Mets, 9–0, to complete the three-game sweep and claim Chatham's second league crown.

In 1983, A's slugger Bob Larimer tied a league mark by crushing three home runs in a single game; his feat demonstrated power to all fields as his trio of clouts against Falmouth left the yard in left, center, and right fields respectively. Chatham boasted the league MVP in 1984, as CCBL Hall of Famer Joey Cora was the A's all-star second baseman, batting .373 and leading the league with 28 stolen bases. The 1985 A's returned to the league championship series behind the play of CCBL Hall of Famers Tim McIntosh and Mark Petkovsek, but were shut down by Cotuit. McIntosh led the league with a .392 batting average, and Petkovsek went 7–1 for the A's and returned to Chatham the following season to win another seven games.

The late 1980s saw a pair of future major league sluggers in the Chatham lineup. Albert "Joey" Belle played for the A's in 1986, and went on to crush 381 major league homers. Jeff Bagwell spent the summers of 1987 and 1988 in Chatham. He struggled in his first season, but followed up with an all-star 1988 campaign in which he hit .315 with a .449 on-base percentage, and went 4-for-4 with a home run in the CCBL All-Star Game. Bagwell was inducted into the National Baseball Hall of Fame in 2017, the fifth former Cape Leaguer to be so honored.

The 1990s: a decade of dominance

Chatham was one of the league's most successful teams throughout the 1990s, finishing in first place atop the East Division five times, qualifying for the playoffs in eight of the ten years, reaching the league championship series six times, and taking home three CCBL crowns.

Skipper Rich Hill's 1992 Chatham squad posted an impressive 31–11 regular season record, and featured ace reliever Scott Smith and CCBL Hall of Fame hurler Steve Duda. Duda had pitched for the A's in 1991, posting a 4–4 record and tossing a no-hitter against Y-D. He was even better in 1992, going 6–1 with a 0.90 ERA. Duda led the A's into the 1992 playoffs against Brewster by tossing a complete game in Chatham's 4–2 Game 1 victory. The A's completed the sweep of the Whitecaps with a 1–0 victory in Game 2 to secure Chatham's spot in the league title series against Cotuit.

The A's took Game 1 of the 1992 championship series at Veterans Field, powered by a two-run blast by Mike Smedes. Game 2 at Lowell Park was an all-time classic. The game went into the 12th inning tied at 2–2 thanks to 11 stellar innings by A's starter Duda, who threw 125 pitches on three days' rest, and appeared to get stronger as the game moved along. Chatham played small-ball in the top of the 12th, pushing across Jeremy Carr, who had walked and reached third on a stolen base and a Cotuit error, then scored on a Brian Garrett single. Smith came on in relief of Duda in the bottom of the frame, and set down the Kettleers in order to clinch the series for the A's and secure Chatham's third CCBL title, with Duda taking home playoff MVP honors.

Midway through the 1993 season, manager Rich Hill left to take a head coaching job at the University of San Francisco, and assistant coach John Schiffner took the helm at Chatham. Schiffner, who had been Hill's assistant since 1990, had played in the CCBL for Harwich from 1974 through 1976, and had served previously as Chatham assistant coach from 1978 to 1982. He went on to pilot Chatham for a league record 25 years, and was inducted into the CCBL Hall of Fame in 2018. Schiffner's 1994 squad featured CCBL Hall of Famer Mike Lowell, an all-star second baseman who hit .307 for the A's. Lowell went on win World Series MVP honors with the 2007 Boston Red Sox. In 1995, Schiffner took the club to the CCBL title series, but lost to Cotuit.

In 1996, Chatham featured the league's Outstanding Pro Prospect, fireballing reliever Matt Anderson, but the team struggled early on, losing eight in a row at one point. The A's finished the regular season a hair over the .500 mark, and met first place Brewster in the East Division playoffs. In Game 1, Chatham's Matt Purkiss clobbered a two-run homer in the third and ace Keith Evans worked 11 innings allowing only four hits as the A's and Whitecaps took a 2–2 tie into the 12th. In the top of the 12th, Chatham's Scott Friedholm smashed a three-run homer to left, and Anderson came on in the bottom half of the frame to nail down the victory. Chatham completed the sweep with a 3–0 win in Game 2 on the strength of second baseman Jermaine Clark's two-run double, and advanced to the title series against Falmouth. 

The 1996 championship series opened at Guv Fuller Field, with Chatham catcher Scott Fitzgerald stifling the Falmouth attack early on in Game 1, cutting down three stolen base attempts in the first three innings. Chatham pushed across three runs playing small-ball and A's starter Seth Etherton was masterful, twirling eight shutout innings and striking out 14 before turning it over to Anderson for the ninth-inning save in the A's 3–0 win. Evans took the mound for the A's in Game 2 at home and followed up his 11-inning semi-finals outing with a complete game gem. Clark, whom Schiffner described as the team's spark plug all season, went 3-for-4 with a pair of doubles to go with his usual stellar work in the field, and the A's downed the Commodores, 6–2, for the title. Evans and Clark shared playoff MVP honors as Chatham sealed its fourth Cape League championship and its first to be clinched at Veterans Field.

Schiffner's 1998 club was loaded with talent. Slugger Matt Cepicky was a .327 hitter who won the All-Star Game Home Run Derby, and took home East Division MVP honors in the East's 3–2 All-Star Game victory at Veterans Field. In addition to Cepicky, the A's boasted an abundance of top moundsmen. 6-foot-8 righty Kyle Snyder was the league's Outstanding Pro Prospect, Tim Lavigne was the Outstanding Relief Pitcher, and CCBL Hall of Famer Rik Currier had an all-star season, posting a 5–2 record with a 2.37 ERA. After sweeping Brewster in the playoff semi-finals, the A's met Wareham in the best-of-five championship series. 

Snyder started Game 1 of the 1998 title set for Chatham at Clem Spillane Field, but got roughed up by the Gatemen, who took the opener, 6–4. The A's held serve in Game 2 at Chatham as Jeremy Wade tossed a complete game five-hitter in the home club's 5–1 victory. Game 3 at Wareham was a classic pitcher's duel as Currier was matched up against CCBL Hall of Famer and future major league all-star Ben Sheets for the Gatemen. The game remained scoreless until the bottom of the 14th when the Gatemen walked off with the game's only run. The A's evened the series again in Game 4 at home, taking the lead in the bottom of the eighth on RBIs by Ryan Earey and Barry Gauch, and hanging on to win, 4–3. Behind the solid mound-work of Devon Nicholson, Chatham clung to a 3–1 lead through seven in a tense Game 5 finale that saw Gatemen skipper Don Reed tossed in the seventh. The A's broke it open in the eighth on a Brian Peterson two-run double, and tacked on another to make it a 6–1 title-clinching win. Cepicky, who went 12-for-32 with six RBI in the playoffs, shared MVP honors with Earey, who was strong in two relief appearances on the hill while going 3-for-10 at the plate.

The 1999 A's enjoyed a 30-win season and finished first in the East Division, falling to Cotuit in the championship series. The team returned Currier who had another brilliant season, posting a 7–0 record with a 1.34 ERA, and being named the league's Outstanding Pitcher. Currier was joined on the staff by CCBL Hall of Famer Derrick DePriest, who did not allow an earned run in 22.2 innings of work, and was named the league's Outstanding Relief Pitcher.

The 2000s and the advent of the Anglers
The early 2000s saw a pair of CCBL Hall of Fame relievers take the mound for Chatham. Hard-throwing righty David Bush posted a 0.84 ERA and led the league with 11 saves in 2000, then returned in 2001 to record an even stingier 0.34 ERA. Fireballer Zane Carlson spent three sparkling seasons with the A's from 2001 through 2003. He earned 12 saves in each of his first two years, and 10 more in his third, with a combined three-year ERA of 2.23. Bush and Carlson led the 2001 squad to the CCBL championship series, but the team was defeated by Wareham.

Former A's manager Ed Lyons was honored by the team in 2001, as the 1982 title-winning skipper's uniform number "29" became the first number to be retired by the franchise. In 2006, the team paid the same honor to longtime assistant coach Matt Fincher, retiring his number "23".

The 2005 A's boasted a wealth of talent, as CCBL batting champion Chris Coghlan was joined by future major league all-stars Todd Frazier, CCBL MVP Evan Longoria, and second-year Chatham hurler Andrew Miller, the CCBL's Outstanding Pitcher and Outstanding Pro Prospect, who was inducted into the CCBL Hall of Fame in 2012.

In late 2008, Major League Baseball announced that it would enforce its trademarks, and required those CCBL teams who shared a nickname with an MLB team to either change their nicknames or buy their uniforms and merchandise only through MLB-licensed vendors. Chatham opted to drop its "Athletics" moniker, and became the Chatham Anglers, a name which celebrated the town's nautical heritage and allowed for continued use of the "A's" nickname. The team also retained its uniform colors and pinstripe pattern.

The 2010s and the end of the Schiffner era
The Anglers qualified for postseason play in seven of ten years in the 2010s, but remained in a championship drought for a second consecutive decade. The 2011 Anglers featured future major league all-star and National League MVP Kris Bryant and CCBL Home Run Derby champ Richie Shaffer. In 2013, the Anglers finished in first place atop the East Division, and starred the CCBL's Outstanding Pitcher, Lukas Schiraldi, and all-star infielder J. D. Davis, who took home All-Star Game MVP honors for the East Division for his double and three-run homer in the East's 9–4 victory.

Chatham boasted the CCBL's Outstanding New England Player in consecutive seasons in 2013 and 2014. West Haven, Connecticut's Tommy Lawrence of the University of Maine took home the honors in 2013 after a stellar season in the Chatham bullpen. Lawrence posted a 3–0 record with a 1.58 ERA, striking out 23 and walking just a single batter in 28 1/3 innings. The following summer, it was Lexington, Massachusetts native and Boston College slugger Chris Shaw. Shaw clubbed seven dingers to lead the league for Chatham in 2014, and finished second in the league with 31 RBIs.

Manager John Schiffner stepped down after the 2017 season, having held the post for a league record 25 summers. In 2018, first-year skipper Tom Holliday led the Anglers to the league championship series, where they were downed by Wareham. Holliday's club finished first in the East Division in 2019, but was bounced from the playoffs by Harwich.

The 2020s
The 2020 CCBL season was cancelled due to the coronavirus pandemic.

CCBL Hall of Fame inductees

The CCBL Hall of Fame and Museum is a history museum and hall of fame honoring past players, coaches, and others who have made outstanding contributions to the CCBL. Below are the inductees who spent all or part of their time in the Cape League with Chatham.

Notable alumni

 Jay Aldrich 1981
 Gabe Alvarez 1993–1994
 Matt Anderson 1996
 James Avery 2003–2004
 Jeff Bagwell 1987–1988
 Jason Bay 1999
 Albert Belle 1986
 Dave Bergman 1973–1974
 Austin Bergner 2017–2018
 Harry Berrios 1992
 Ken Bolek 1975
 Sean Bouchard 2016
 Kip Bouknight 1999
 Brad Boxberger 2008
 Scott Bradley 1979–1980
 Ryan Braun 2000
 Charles Brewer 2007–2008
 Brooks Brown 2005
 Corey Brown 2006
 Warren Brusstar 1971
 Kris Bryant 2011
 J. B. Bukauskas 2016
 Nick Burdi 2012
 Zack Burdi 2014
 Jack Burns 1927
 Michael Busch 2018
 David Bush 2000–2001
 Eric Byrnes 1995
 Shawn Camp 1996
 John Caneira 1973
 Luke Carlin 2001
 Chris Carpenter 2007
 Justin Cassel 2004
 Daniel Castano 2015
 Matt Cepicky 1998
 Andrew Chin 2014
 Jermaine Clark 1996
 Tony Cogan 1996
 Chris Coghlan 2005
 Mike Colangelo 1996
 P. J. Conlon 2014
 Andy Cook 1988
 Scott Coolbaugh 1985–1986
 Tim Cooney 2011
 Joey Cora 1984
 Will Craig 2015
 Pat Creeden 1925
 Brad Cresse 1997
 Jermaine Curtis 2007
 John Curtis 1967
 Jamie D'Antona 2002
 Jeff Datz 1981
 Glenn Davis 1980
 J. D. Davis 2013
 David DeJesus 1998–1999
 Nick Derba 2004–2006
 Tom Drees 1984
 Matt Duffy 2009
 Matt Dunbar 1989
 Parker Dunshee 2015
 Allan Dykstra 2006–2007
 Ed Easley 2006
 Adam Engel 2012
 John Ericks 1987
 Danny Espinosa 2006
 Seth Etherton 1995–1996
 Stuart Fairchild 2016
 Buck Farmer 2011
 Tim Federowicz 2007
 Huck Flener 1989
 Darrin Fletcher 1986
 Randy Flores 1995
 Ron Flores 1998
 Jason Foley 2016
 P. J. Forbes 1988
 Jake Fraley 2014–2015
 Jeff Frazier 2003
 Todd Frazier 2005–2006
 Marvin Freeman 1983
 Scott Friedholm 1996
 Tom Funk 1982
 Kyle Funkhouser 2013
 Hunter Gaddis 2018
 Matt Gage 2013
 Zac Gallen 2014–2015
 Rusty Gerhardt 1969
 Chris Getz 2003–2004
 Danny Godby 1965–1967
 Yan Gomes 2008
 Artie Gore 1929
 Jason Grabowski 1995–1996
 Josiah Gray 2017
 Gary Green 1982
 Grant Green 2008
 Adam Greenberg 2001
 George Greer 1965–1967
 Tom Grieve 1966
 Jeff Groth 1978
 Jesse Hahn 2009
 Dave Hajek 1988
 David Hale 2008
 Brad Halsey 2001
 Garrett Hampson 2014–2015
 Jason Hart 1997
 Matt Harvey 2008–2009
 Rod Henderson 1991
 Lincoln Henzman 2016
 Mark Higgins 1983
 Rich Hill 2000–2001
 Taylor Hill 2009
 Chad Holbrook 1992
 Ricky Horton 1978
 Charlie Hough 1964
 Peter Hoy 1987
 David Huff 2004–2005
 Jared Hughes 2005
 Rick Huisman 1989
 Chris Iannetta 2002
 Joe Inglett 1997
 Joseph Jabar 1966–1967
 Ray Jarvis 1964
 Connor Joe 2013
 Greg Jones 2018
 James Karinchak 2016
 Matt Kata 1997–1998
 Alex Katz 2014
 Mark Kiefer 1987
 Paul Kilgus 1982
 Scott Klingenbeck 1991
 Ryan Klosterman 2003
 Andrew Knapp 2012
 Reiss Knehr 2017
 Matt Koch 2011
 Kenny Koplove 2013
 Bobby Korecky 2001
 Tim Lahey 2003
 Chris Lambert 2003
 Shea Langeliers 2017
 Dominic Leone 2011
 Jeff Liefer 1995
 Pat Light 2011
 Todd Linden 2000
 Evan Longoria 2005
 Mike Lowell 1994
 Tyler Lyons 2009
 Mike MacDougal 1998
 Ty Madden 2019
 Alek Manoah 2018
 Justin Marks 2008
 Evan Marzilli 2011
 Isaac Mattson 2016
 Patrick Mazeika 2014
 Marcus McBeth 2000
 Mike McCoy 2001
 Collin McHugh 2007
 Tim McIntosh 1986
 Tom McMillan 1972
 Kevin Mench 1998
 Whit Merrifield 2009
 Drew Meyer 2000–2001
 Chris Michalak 1991
 Andrew Miller 2004–2005
 Tommy Milone 2007
 Nate Mondou 2015
 Ray Montgomery 1989
 Trey Moore 1993
 Kevin Morgan 1989
 Mike Moriarty 1994
 Colt Morton 2002
 Thurman Munson 1967
 Greg Norton 1992
 Dan O'Brien 1974
 Rouglas Odor 1987
 Ross Ohlendorf 2003
 Chad Orvella 2002
 Mike Pagliarulo 1980
 Andre Pallante 2017
 Kevin Parada 2021
 Bobby Parnell 2004
 Dan Peltier 1988
 Jeremy Peña 2017
 Mark Petkovsek 1985–1986
 Ed Phillips 1963
 Chad Pinder 2012
 Chris Pittaro 1981
 Alex Presley 2005
 A. J. Puckett 2015
 Zach Putnam 2007
 Kevin Reese 1999
 Tom Riginos 1988
 Matt Rizzotti 2006
 Brian Roberts 1998
 Dewey Robinson 1975
 John Schneider 2001
 Scott Schoeneweis 1993
 Jaime Schultz 2012
 Tanner Scott 2014
 Andre Scrubb 2015
 Kyle Seager 2007–2008
 Kevin Seitzer 1982
 Richie Shaffer 2011
 Bryan Shaw 2007
 Chris Shaw 2014
 Jim Sherman 1980–1981
 Zack Short 2015
 Kyle Snyder 1998
 Chad Sobotka 2013
 Sammy Solís 2008
 Peter Soteropoulos 2001
 Jacob Stallings 2009–2010
 Tim Stauffer 2002
 Steve Stemle 1996
 Mike Stenhouse 1977–1979
 Todd Steverson 1991
 Steve Stone 1968
 Marc Sullivan 1978
 Dave Swartzbaugh 1988
 Mark Sweeney 1988
 Steve Taylor 1976
 Joey Terdoslavich 2009
 Walt Terrell 1979
 Shawn Tolleson 2009
 Spencer Torkelson 2018–2019
 Jim Tracy 1976
 John Trautwein 1982
 Pat Valaika 2012
 Logan Verrett 2009–2010
 Ken Vining 1994–1996
 Derek Wallace 1991
 Joe Wallis 1971–1972
 Ben Wanger 2018
 Adam Warren 2008
 Mickey Weston 1981
 Carson Whisenhunt 2022
 Alex White 2007–2008
 Matt White 1997
 Garrett Whitlock 2016
 Howard J. Whitmore Jr. 1926
 Matt Williams 1991
 Scott Williamson 1996
 Bobby Witt 1983
 Tanner Witt 2021
 Rob Wooten 2007
 Vance Worley 2006
 Chris Young 2000
 T. J. Zeuch 2015
 Brad Ziegler 2001

Yearly results

Results by season, 1923–1931

* There were no postseason playoffs during the period 1923–1931. The regular season pennant winner was simply crowned as the league champion.† Played from 1927 to 1929 as combined "Chatham-Harwich" team

Results by season, 1946–1962

* Regular seasons split into first and second halves are designated as (A) and (B).

Results by season, 1963–present

League award winners

(*) - Indicates co-recipient

All-Star Game selections

Italics - Indicates All-Star Game Home Run Hitting Contest participant (1988 to present)

No-hit games

Managerial history

(*) - Season count excludes 2020 CCBL season cancelled due to coronavirus pandemic.

John Schiffner, one of the Cape League's all-time winningest skippers

Chatham boasts one of the winningest managers in Cape Cod Baseball League history in John Schiffner, affectionately known as "Schiff" across amateur baseball. Schiffner retired after his 25th year managing the Chatham A's in 2017, and served as either the team's manager or an assistant coach for 34 total seasons. Schiffner joined legendary Chatham manager Ed Lyons as an assistant coach just two years after graduating from Providence College. While at Providence, Schiffner had spent three summers playing in the Cape League for the Harwich Mariners from 1974 to 1976. After being drafted and playing part of a minor league season in the Pittsburgh Pirates organization in 1977, Schiffner returned to the Cape as an Assistant Coach in Harwich for the summer. During the 1977 playoffs, A's Manager Ed Lyons approached Schiffner and invited him to join his staff for the following summer, and Schiffner quickly accepted the offer.

Schiffner served as an Assistant Coach under Lyons in Chatham from 1978 to 1982, then returned in 1990 in the same role after a stint scouting for the Montreal Expos. Schiffner became the Chatham A's manager on July 7, 1993, when manager Rich Hill accepted the head coaching position at the University of San Francisco and took his new post immediately. Schiffner took over a last place team more than halfway into the season, but oversaw a stunning 16-7 record down the stretch as the A's claimed a first-place finish and Schiffner was offered the position of manager on a permanent basis, a major breakthrough for him after a significant number of unsuccessful managerial interviews in Chatham and elsewhere around the Cape League in previous years.

Including that 1993 campaign, Schiffner managed the A's for 25 years, stepping down at the end of the 2017 Cape Cod Baseball League season. He managed the A's to CCBL championships in 1996 and 1998, and became widely regarded as the face and voice of Cape Cod Baseball.

Schiffner announced that the 2017 season would be his last after a Chatham Anglers game in Harwich in July 2017. Soon after, he revealed that he was leaving Chatham to become an assistant coach at the University of Maine, where he would work with new Maine head coach Nick Derba, the catcher of the powerful 2005 Chatham A's team and one of Schiffner's favorite former players. Schiffner had previously served as the volunteer assistant coach at Maine during the 2013 season, when Derba was the Black Bears' hitting coach under current Stetson University head coach Steve Trimper. On August 10, 2017, the Chatham Athletic Association announced that former Oklahoma State University head baseball coach Tom Holliday would succeed Schiffner, beginning with the 2018 Cape Cod Baseball League season.

Schiffner also served as the head baseball coach for 33 years at Plainfield High School in Plainfield, Connecticut, where he also taught history for over three decades. He is the winningest coach in Connecticut state high school baseball history, and often spotted future Cape League talent on high school fields across the state, including current Major League pitchers Matt Harvey and Dominic Leone, both of whom pitched against Schiffner's teams in high school and went on to play for him in Chatham before reaching the Majors. Schiffner was inducted into the Connecticut High School Coaches' Association Hall of Fame in November 2017.

Internship program
The Chatham Athletic Association offers internships in Sports Business and Sports Media. Students majoring in sport management, business, marketing, and accounting/finance are mentored on sports-business processes including trend analysis, inventory management, profitability analysis, and marketing projects.

Live broadcasts
In 2003, Chatham became the first Cape Cod Baseball League team to start broadcasting games, and has received national attention as a training grounds for young broadcasters. The Anglers provide live broadcasts for all 44 regular season games in addition to the playoffs. All home games have a live video and audio stream while road games are audio only. Viewers can find the live video and audio stream by visiting the Broadcast Central page of the Anglers website. Fans can also listen by calling TRZ Teamline toll free to for all broadcasts 1-800-846-4700, code 3841.

Below is a list of those who have served as broadcast announcers for the A's. 
 Guy Benson (Northwestern University) 2003–2006 
 Dan D'Uva (Syracuse University, Fordham University) 2003–2008
 Kyle Whitehead (Northwestern University) 2007
 Mike Toper (Syracuse University) 2007
 Brian Clark (Fordham University) 2008, 2009
 Scott Braun (University of Miami) 2009, 2010
 Aaron Canada (George Mason University) 2010, 2011
 Chris Fitzgerald (University of Oregon) 2011, 2012
 Brandon Liebhaber (Northwestern University) 2012, 2013
 Keith Zubrow (Syracuse University) 2013
 Jonny Wincott (Syracuse University) 2014, 2015
 Dom Cotroneo (Arizona State University) 2014, 2015
 Jake Eisenberg (University of Maryland) 2016
 Evan Stockton (Syracuse University) 2016
 Drew Carter (Syracuse University) 2017
 Max Herz (Vanderbilt University) 2017
 Josh Schaefer (Arizona State University) 2018, 2019
 Cooper Boardman (Syracuse University) 2018, 2019
 Emmanuel Berbari (Fordham University) 2021
 Ben Shulman (Syracuse University) 2021
 Joe Puccio (Syracuse University) 2022
 Ian Unsworth (Syracuse University) 2022

In popular culture

Summer Catch (2001, Movie)

The Chatham A's were featured prominently in the 2001 Warner Bros. motion picture Summer Catch, starring Freddy Prinze Jr. and Jessica Biel, a comedic sports movie depicting fictional ballplayers spending a summer in Chatham filled with baseball and booze. Though the movie is an extreme fictionalization, some of the fictional players are loosely based on past A's players, and real life A's manager John Schiffner is the fictional team's coach, as portrayed by actor Brian Dennehy. The majority of the movie was filmed in South Carolina, though small portions of scenic shots were taken in Chatham at Veterans Field. The A's actual logos, colors, and uniforms are used in the movie, along with loose copies of other Cape Cod Baseball League team names, logos, and colors.

The Last Best League (2004, Book)

Jim Collins' The Last Best League (2004) is a non-fiction account of the 2002 Chatham A's, which featured infielder Jamie D'Antona and manager John Schiffner as the book's protagonists. Collins follows and recounts every move the players, coaches, fans, and others make in the ethnographic account of the full 2002 Cape Cod Baseball League and Chatham A's season. The book delves deeply into the life and baseball journey of John Schiffner, who was already the longest-tenured manager in the league and the undisputed face of Cape Cod Baseball at the time of the book's writing, even though he still stood 15 years away from retirement. Schiffner and his longtime assistant coach Matt Fincher are profiled heavily in the book. Fincher was the longtime head baseball coach at University of South Carolina-Upstate.

D'Antona, a highly touted power hitter from Wake Forest University who quickly becomes Collins' primary player focus in the book, is depicted as a laid-back ballplayer whose potential is hindered by occasional lapses in judgment and lack of effort. Collins follows D'Antona extensively both on and off the field, including to his job at the Chatham Fish Pier, where D'Antona delivered fresh fish to businesses all over Chatham at the crack of dawn. Following a short Major League career and a stint playing professionally in Japan, D'Antona returned to Chatham as the Anglers' hitting coach in 2017, working under John Schiffner in his final season as A's manager.

The two members of the 2002 A's who went on to the longest professional baseball careers are Chris Iannetta and Tim Stauffer. A starting pitcher from the University of Richmond, Stauffer was the best pitcher on the 2002 A's and amongst the best in the entire Cape League that summer. He was selected fourth overall by the San Diego Padres in the 2003 MLB Draft based largely off his performance on Cape Cod, and pitched in the Major Leagues for 10 seasons. He appeared in 201 MLB games, posting a 3.97 career ERA before retiring after the 2015 season. Iannetta, a catcher who just completed his 12th Major League season in 2017, is not one of the predominant characters in The Last Best League. One of a select few freshman hitters in the Cape League, Iannetta struggled all summer at the plate after his first year at the University of North Carolina, and was not asked back to Chatham the next summer, according to Collins in the book. He was selected in the fourth round of the 2004 MLB Draft by the Colorado Rockies, and has played in over 1000 MLB games, including over 900 starts at catcher for four different teams.

See also
 Chatham Anglers players

References

External links

Rosters

 2000
 2001
 2002
 2003
 2004
 2005
 2006
 2007
 2008
 2009
 2010
 2011
 2012
 2013
 2014
 2015
 2016
 2017
 2018
 2019
 2021
 2022

Other links
Chatham Anglers official site
CCBL Home Page

Cape Cod Baseball League teams
Amateur baseball teams in Massachusetts
Chatham, Massachusetts